James D. H. Peterson (August 7, 1894 - January 18, 1961) was a member of the Wisconsin State Assembly.

Biography
Peterson was born on August 7, 1894, in La Crosse, Wisconsin. He attended the University of Wisconsin-La Crosse, University of Wisconsin-Madison and Washington and Lee University. During World War I, he served with the United States Army. He died on January 18, 1961, in La Crosse, Wisconsin.

Political career
Peterson was twice a member of the Assembly. First, from 1925 to 1926, and second, from 1955 to 1960. He was a Republican.

References

1894 births
1961 deaths
Politicians from La Crosse, Wisconsin
Military personnel from Wisconsin
United States Army soldiers
United States Army personnel of World War I
University of Wisconsin–La Crosse alumni
University of Wisconsin–Madison alumni
Washington and Lee University alumni
Republican Party members of the Wisconsin State Assembly